Bad Lieutenant: Port of Call New Orleans is a 2009 American crime drama film directed by Werner Herzog and starring Nicolas Cage, Eva Mendes, Tom Bower, Jennifer Coolidge, Alvin 'Xzibit' Joiner, Val Kilmer, and Brad Dourif. Though the film's title and story loosely resemble that of Abel Ferrara's 1992 film Bad Lieutenant, according to Herzog, it is neither a sequel nor a remake; its only commonality is a corrupt policeman as the central character. Nonetheless, the director of the original Bad Lieutenant film, Abel Ferrara, expressed dismay that the Herzog film was being made. Both Bad Lieutenant films were produced by Edward R. Pressman.

The film premiered on September 9, 2009 at the 66th Venice International Film Festival where it won the Christopher D. Smithers Foundation Special Award for Herzog. It opened in general release in the United States on November 20, 2009.

Plot
In August 2005, Terence McDonagh (Nicolas Cage) is a New Orleans police sergeant. While cleaning out a locker after Hurricane Katrina, he notices that a prisoner may not have been transferred. When he finds the prisoner about to drown, he mocks him before eventually jumping in the water to save him. He is promoted to police lieutenant and given a medal for his work, but has suffered a serious back injury because of the rescue. As a result, he is prescribed Vicodin to manage the pain.

Six months later, McDonagh is now not only addicted to painkillers, but is habitually using several other drugs including cocaine and cannabis. His girlfriend Frankie Donnenfeld (Eva Mendes), a prostitute, also does cocaine and they often share drugs. He has convinced Heidi (Fairuza Balk), a former co-worker now in another police division, to bring him drugs sent to the evidence room. He has become estranged from his father Pat (Tom Bower), a recovering alcoholic, and his alcoholic stepmother, Genevieve (Jennifer Coolidge). Over the course of the film, he uses his position as an officer to bully people and steal more drugs.

McDonagh is assigned to investigate the murders of five illegal immigrants from Senegal, who were killed for selling drugs in a gang leader's neighborhood. The gang leader, Big Fate (Alvin 'Xzibit' Joiner), has two associates: Midget (Lucius Baston) and G (Tim Bellow). After both are arrested, Big Fate willingly comes to the police station with his lawyer. As they try to gather evidence against Big Fate, McDonagh goes back to a hotel room where he finds Frankie beaten by one of her clients, a seemingly well-connected man named Justin (Shea Whigham). McDonagh threatens Justin and takes $10,000 from him. Later on, a delivery boy who was an auditory witness of the murder scene goes missing. McDonagh finds the witness's grandmother, who works at a nursing home, and threatens to kill one of her patients to make her divulge where the witness has gone. The old woman has sent him to stay with her family in England, to prevent him from getting involved in gang affairs.

In addition to dealing with the murder investigation, McDonagh gets in trouble with his bookie Ned (Brad Dourif) for not paying his debts. What little money McDonagh has is given to a gangster who works for Justin. The gangster (William M. Finkelstein) now requests $50,000 - five times the amount stolen from Justin - as compensation, and gives McDonagh two days to get it. As a result of his treatment of the old woman, McDonagh is on modified duty and his gun placed in the evidence room. McDonagh goes to Big Fate and they become partners, with McDonagh supplying Big Fate with police information. McDonagh now has enough money to pay off his debts to his bookie and uses his surplus earnings to place a new bet. During a celebration of the successful partnership between McDonagh and Big Fate, the gangster shows up, demanding his money. McDonagh offers him a cut worth more than $50,000 from a bag filled with pure heroin, but the gangster wants to take it all. Big Fate and his crew end up killing the gangsters.

To further celebrate their partnership, McDonagh implores Big Fate to smoke crack cocaine with his "lucky crack pipe." He does, and McDonagh later plants the pipe at the murder scene of the Senegal family. The department uses this new evidence to arrest Big Fate and his cronies, but when he and McDonagh are alone with Big Fate, McDonagh's partner, Stevie Pruit (Val Kilmer), threatens to kill Big Fate, as Pruit does not want him to have the chance to escape conviction. McDonagh is outraged at this idea and arrests Big Fate, showing that despite his addictions he can still perform his duties as an officer. McDonagh is later promoted to police captain.

One year later, McDonagh appears to be sober, as does Frankie (who is pregnant with McDonagh's child) and McDonagh's parents, but it turns out that McDonagh is still taking heroin. He encounters the prisoner whom he saved at the beginning of the film, and the man, recognizing McDonagh, exclaims that McDonagh saved his life. The man has been sober for almost a year and offers to help McDonagh finally escape his own addiction. McDonagh simply asks, "Do fish have dreams?" The film ends with the two men in the Aquarium of the Americas sitting on the floor with their backs against a wall-sized fish tank.

Cast
 Nicolas Cage as Lieutenant Terence McDonagh, the titular bad lieutenant
 Eva Mendes as Frankie Donnenfeld, A Sex Worker and Terence's Love Interest
 Jennifer Coolidge as Genevieve McDonagh
 Val Kilmer as Detective Stevie Pruit, Terence's Partner
 Brad Dourif as Ned Schoenholtz, Terence's Bookie
 Alvin "Xzibit" Joiner as Donald "Big Fate" Godshaw
 Fairuza Balk as Officer Heidi
 Irma P. Hall as Binnie Rogers
 Tom Bower as Pat McDonagh, Terence's Father
 Michael Shannon as Officer Mundt
 Vondie Curtis-Hall as Captain James Brasser
 Shawn Hatosy as Detective Armand Benoit
 Denzel Whitaker as Daryl
 Shea Whigham as Justin
 Katie Chonacas as Tina
 Lucius Baston as Deshawn "Midget" Hackett
 Tim Bellow as Gary "G" Jenkins
 Sam Velasquez as Jerry "Gremlin" Tennison, Tina's Love Interest
 William M. Finkelstein as Gangster

Production

Development
The film was first announced in May 2008 with Werner Herzog to direct and Nicolas Cage to star. The script was penned by TV writer William Finkelstein.

Actress Eva Mendes, who starred with Cage in the 2007 film Ghost Rider, joined the cast the following June.

Connection to the 1992 film
Screenwriter William Finkelstein submitted the original draft of the screenplay to Herzog with the title "Bad Lieutenant."  Finkelstein was aware of the 1992 Abel Ferrara film of that name, but swore to Herzog that this would not be a remake, and the director insisted on renaming the film.  The two negotiated over the title and settled on Bad Lieutenant: Port of Call New Orleans.

One major change from the original film was moving the setting from New York City to New Orleans. Herzog insists that the film is not a remake, saying, "It only has a corrupt policeman as the central character and that's about it."

At the 81st Academy Awards, Herzog stated that he has never seen Ferrara's film, saying "I haven't seen it, so I can't compare it. It has nothing to do with it." Herzog did not like the idea of a remake and desired to change the title of the film, but was unsuccessful. Herzog stated, "I battled against the title from the first moment on", but added, "I can live with it, I have no problem with it at all. The title is probably a mistake, but so be it."

Filming
Principal photography began on July 7, 2008 in Louisiana and also around South Mississippi, shooting some scenes at the Hollywood Casino in Bay St. Louis.

Abel Ferrara's reaction
Abel Ferrara, director of the 1992 film, has been quoted by various media outlets as being very angry about the film. After it was first announced, Ferrara was quoted as saying "As far as remakes go, ... I wish these people die in Hell. I hope they're all in the same streetcar, and it blows up." When asked later for his response to Ferrara's statements, Herzog stated that he does not know who Ferrara is, saying "I've never seen a film by him. I have no idea who he is." At a press conference at the Venice Film Festival after the film's premiere, Herzog said of Ferrara, "I would like to meet the man," and "I have a feeling that if we met and talked -- over a bottle of whisky, I should add -- I think we could straighten everything out." In 2018 at Newcastle International Film Festival Ferrara said that he had eventually met Herzog and made peace with him.

Release

Although production on the film was completed in 2008, the film did not quickly find a distributor for a wide release. The film had its world premiere at the 2009 Venice Film Festival, and was also screened at the 2009 Toronto Film Festival and the 2009 Telluride Film Festival.

Box office
Bad Lieutenant: Port of Call New Orleans opened theatrically on November 20, 2009 by First Look Studios in 27 venues, earning $245,398 in its opening weekend, ranking number 22 at the box office. The film ended its run on March 4, 2010 with 96 venues being its widest release, having grossed $1,702,112 in the domestic box office and $8,886,990 overseas for a worldwide total of $10,589,102.

Critical response
The film received largely positive reviews from critics. Review aggregation website Rotten Tomatoes reports an 86% "Certified Fresh" rating based on 154 reviews, with an rating average of 7.24/10. The site's Critics Consensus reads: "Befitting its unorthodox origins, this Bad Lieutenant benefits from Werner Herzog's typically fearless direction and a delightfully unhinged Nicolas Cage in the title role." On Metacritic, the film has a 69 out of 100 rating based on 32 critics, indicating "generally favorable reviews."

The Guardian critic Xan Brooks called Cage's work in the film "surely his best performance in years." Blogging about the film from the 2009 Toronto International Film Festival, Roger Ebert declared: "Nicolas Cage is as good as anyone since Klaus Kinski at portraying a man whose head is exploding. It's a hypnotic performance." He also wrote that the film is very different from Abel Ferrara's 1992 film and that "comparisons are pointless." Ebert named the film as among the top 10 best mainstream films of 2009, and then included it in his list of the best films of the decade.

As an example of post-irony
Matthew Collins, in The Georgetown Voice, has cited the film as an example of post-irony:

Accolades

Top lists
The film appeared on several critics' lists of "best films of 2009", including:
 Roger Ebert: top 10 "mainstream films" of 2009
 Aidil Rusli of The Malaysian Insider: favorite movies from 2009
 The Canadian Press: top 10 films of 2009
 Kim Morgan of The Huffington Post: #2 among top 10 films of 2009
 Stan Hall of The Oregonian: #1 among "foreign language and indie films of 2009"
 Jay Stone of Canwest News Service: #1 best film of 2009
 Les Cahiers du cinéma listed it second on their annual Top Ten of 2010, and also featured the film on the cover of their March 2010 issue.

In some regions, the film was not released until 2010:
 James McMahon of NME: #5 among top 10 films of 2010
 Neil Young of Tribune: #6 among top 10 films of 2010

Awards
 Venice Film Festival 2009 Golden Lion nomination for Werner Herzog (lost to Samuel Maoz for Lebanon)
 Christopher D. Smithers Foundation Special Award for Werner Herzog
 Independent Spirit Awards 2010 Best Cinematography nomination for Peter Zeitlinger (lost to Roger Deakins for A Serious Man)
 Toronto Film Critics Association 2010 Best Actor award for Nicolas Cage
 Jameson Dublin International Film Festival 2010 Special Jury Prize award

See also

 2009 in film

References

External links
 
 
 
 

2009 films
2009 crime drama films
American crime drama films
Films directed by Werner Herzog
Films set in New Orleans
Films set in 2005
Films set in 2006
Films set in 2007
Films shot in New Orleans
Films about police misconduct
Films about Hurricane Katrina
Films about the illegal drug trade
Films about cocaine
Saturn Films films
Films scored by Mark Isham
Films shot in Mississippi
2000s English-language films
2000s American films